The Bauman Moscow State Technical University, BMSTU, sometimes colloquially referred as the Bauman School or Baumanka is a public technical university (Polytechnic) located in Moscow, Russia. Bauman University is a Russian technical university offering B.S., M.S & PhD degrees in various engineering fields and applied sciences.

History

Bauman University is the second oldest educational institution in Russia after Lomonosov Moscow State University (1755). In 1763, the Russian empress Catherine II founded the Educational Imperial House. On October 5th 1826, the Dowager Empress Maria Feodorovna issued a decree to establish "great workshops for different crafts with bedrooms, a dining room, etc." as a part of the Moscow Foundling Home in the German Quarter. All craft pupils were moved from the Orphanage there. On July 1st 1830, Emperor Nicholas I approved the Statute of Moscow Craft School. It was the inception of the first Russian technical university.

Russia's developing industry needed skilled labor in many trades with the aim of the new school being to train artisans with a theoretical background to improve and spread skills in various trades all over Russia. New school was created to teach crafts as well as basic sciences. In 1868  MCS was reorganized into the Imperial Moscow Technical School (IMTS) under the directorship of Victor Della-Vos. The main purpose of IMTS was to "educate construction engineers, mechanical engineers and industrial technologists". 

The IMTS was financially supported by the Government and industrialists. Its management was democratic. A key feature of the new institution was its educational system called the "Russian method", which unifies a broad and intensive theoretical preparation with a deep practical education closely connected with industries. The school participated in the Universal Exposition in 1873 in Vienna and the Philadelphia Centennial Exhibition of 1876. It proved to be influential on John Daniel Runkle when he introduced manual training alongside theoretical training at the Massachusetts Institute of Technology. It was also applied to other American technical universities.  Many scientists taught in IMTS, such as D. Mendeleev, N. Jukovsky, P. Chebychev, S. Chaplygin, A. Yershov, D. Sovetkin, F. Dmitriev, A. Letnikov, A. Gavrilenko.

In the Soviet period IMTS was renamed Bauman Moscow Higher Technical School (BMHTS), after revolutionary Nikolay Bauman. BMHTS continued education of engineers for machine and instrument building. In 1938, new military departments were created in MHTS such as tank, artillery, and ammunition. In 1948 a rocket department was added.

During the first half of the 20th century, Bauman University formed and founded more than 70 technical universities in the USSR. Some of them are now well known institutions, such as Moscow Aviation Institute, Moscow Power Engineering Institute, Moscow University of Civil Engineering, Moscow Chemical Institute, Moscow Communication and Informatics University, Central Aerohydrodynamics Institute TSAGI, and the Military Academy of Aviation Engineering Joukovski.

On 27 July 1989 USSR State committee for peoples education conferred on Moscow Higher Technical School a name of Bauman Moscow Technical University (BMSTU). BMSTU was honored to be the first Russian technical university. Nearly 200,000 students graduated from the University. Most of them chose to become scientists or engineers in leading research centers, universities, private and government owned companies. Many of government officials, chief designers, CEOs of big enterprises, and cosmonauts are Bauman graduates, as noted below in the alumni section.

Many Bauman University graduates are world-renowned: Sergei Korolev for the first satellite in space and first man and woman in space, Andrey Tupolev for the world first supersonic passenger plane, Nikolay Dollezhal for the world first civil nuclear plant, Vladimir Shukhov for the first method and the world first petrol cracking plant as well as for the first hyperboloid structures in architecture, Nikolay Zhukovsky for the foundation of aerodynamics and hydrodynamics sciences, Pavel Sukhoi for the foundation of Sukhoi Aerospace Design Bureau.
Some of the specialized departments of BMSTU are located outside Moscow in cities of Moscow Oblast: Krasnogorsk (Russian: Красногорск), Reutov (Russian: Реутов), Korolyov (Russian: Королёв).  There is also a large branch of the University in Kaluga (Russian: Калуга).

Bauman University today

The Bauman University is commonly regarded as one of Russia's most prestigious universities and has high entry requirements for its prospective students. The Bauman University is regularly ranked first in official government and business press rating. The Bauman University also regularly occupies top 3 places in rating of alumni hunted by biggest Russian companies. In 2011/2012 QS World University rankings, BMSTU ranked 379th overall and 229th in Engineering & IT.

The Bauman University has a National Research Center status, the financing of Bauman University is provided by a separate expense asset of Russian National Budget independently of Ministry of Education.  BMSTU is Skolkovo innovation center founder.

Educational programs

The admissions process includes exams on math, physics, and Russian. The university accepts one in ten applicants, which means that there are more than 30000 applicants. More than 2,600 of them pass through two years of preparation courses, another 2,000 follow studies in high schools partners of Bauman University. Participation in admission process requires a gage of original high school certificate which prevents applicants to take part in Lomonosov Moscow State University admission process at the same time.

The academic year in this university begins on 1 September, and is divided into two terms (semesters). Students take exams at the end of each semester. The course of study lasts 6 years without interrupt for engineer specialist degree. But over the last few years the Bauman University has continued to integrate with the Bologna Process. And today some students learn using two step educational system.  The first two years students study general engineering subjects. In the third year students begin to study specialized subjects. The university scientific library was founded in 1830.

Branches

Dmitrov 

The first order of the BMSTU Dmitrov Branch was bringing into service in 1965. In 1965–1973 – Suburban Educational and Science-Experimental Centre, in 1973-2000 - Educational-Experimental Centre.

Kaluga 
In 1959 BMSTU opened in Kaluga the branch for education of the industrial machine- and device engineering personnel. Nowadays the BMSTU Kaluga Branch is a technical institute of Kaluga region. It consists of 7 buildings. The Kaluga Branch is an educational-science- manufacturing complex, including: 5 departments (machine engineering technologies; design-mechanical; electronics, informatics and management; socioeconomic; fundamental science), military education department, computer bureau, library with reading-rooms, sport camp and sport pavilion.

Publishing

The Bauman University Publishing House was established in January, 1989 on the base of university publishing department. The first issue of Baumanets newspaper was printed on 18 February 1923. At that time the newspaper was called Udarnik. It has been printed for 90 years since then.

In 1990 Bauman Publishing House started issuing theoretical and applied broad-scoped "Vestnik MSTU". There are educational materials in different scientific areas: Physical and Mathematical sciences, Information and Computer science, Optics, Mechanical, Radio, Instrument and Power Engineering, Laser Technology, Economics, Law and other subjects.

Notable faculty and alumni 

 Sergei Pavlovich Korolev - Lead Soviet rocket engineer and spacecraft designer, founder of soviet cosmonautics
 Vladimir Grigorievich Shukhov - Russian engineer, scientist and architect, inventor of the Shukhov cracking process 
Vladimir Solovyov - Soviet cosmonaut and first man on Mir
Andrey Nikolaevich Tupolev - pioneering Soviet aircraft engineer, chief designer of the "Tupolev" aircraft
 Pavel Osipovich Sukhoi - Soviet aerospace engineer, chief designer of the "Sukhoi" military aircraft 
 Pafnuty Lvovich Chebyshev - Russian mathematician and mechanician
 Vladimir Mikhailovich Myasishchev - Soviet aircraft designer
 Georgy Malenkov - Prime Minister of the Union of Soviet Socialist Republics
 Nikolai Yegorovich Zhukovsky - Russian scientist and mechanician, founder of modern aerodynamics
 Vladimir Nikolayevich Chelomei - Soviet mechanics scientist, aviation and missile engineer 
 Nikolay Alekseevich Pilyugin - Soviet chief designer of rocket guidance systems
 Semyon Alekseyevich Lavochkin - Soviet aircraft designer, founder of the Lavochkin aircraft design bureau
 Vladimir Mikhailovich Petlyakov - Soviet aeronautical engineer
 Sergey Alexeyevich Chaplygin - Russian and Soviet physicist, mathematician, and mechanical engineer
 Sergei Alekseyevich Lebedev - Soviet scientist in the fields of electrical engineering and computer science, designer of the first Soviet computers
 Ivan Georgievich Petrovsky - Soviet mathematician
 Vladimir Evgenievich Zotikov - Russian and Soviet scientist and textile engineer 
 Lev Iakovlevich Karpov - Russian Chemist and Bolshevik revolutionary
 Sergei Ivanovich Vavilov - Soviet physicist, the President of the USSR Academy of Sciences
 Arkady Grigoryevich Mordvinov - Soviet architect and construction manager
 Aleksandr Aleksandrovich Mikulin - Soviet aircraft engine designer and chief designer in the Mikulin design bureau
 Sergey Alexandrovich Afanasyev - Soviet engineer and statesman, space and defence industry executive, the first Minister of the Soviet Ministry of General Machine Building.
 Alfred Rosenberg - German Nazi political figure, influential ideologue of the NSDAP, executed for war crimes
 Sergey Pavlovich Nepobedimiy - Soviet designer of rocket weaponry 
 Nikolay Antonovich Dollezhal - Soviet mechanical engineer, a key figure in Soviet atomic bomb project and chief designer of nuclear reactors
 Vladimir Pavlovich Barmin - Soviet scientist, designer of the rocket launch complexes
 Alexander Leonovich Kemurdzhian - Soviet engineer, first planetary rovers chassis designer 
 Konstantin Petrovich Feoktistov - Soviet cosmonaut and space engineer
 Oleg Ivanovich Skripochka - Soviet cosmonaut and space engineer
 Oleg Grigoryevich Makarov - Soviet cosmonaut.
 Gennadi Mikhailovich Strekalov - Soviet engineer and cosmonaut
 Vassili Nesterenko - Soviet Nuclear Energy physicist 
 Maksim Zakharovich Saburov - Soviet engineer, economist and politician
 Zou Jiahua - former Vice Premier of China
 Georgy Trefilov - founder and the former co-owner of the "MARTA" holding
 Dmitry Grishin - Russian businessman, investor and Internet entrepreneur. Co-founder, Chairman and CEO of Mail.ru Group
 Dmitry Sklyarov - Russian programmer, hacker and cryptographer
 Igor Sysoev - creator and developer of the Nginx Web server and founder of NGINX, Inc
 Alexander Volkov (fighter) - professional Mixed Martial Artist, current UFC Heavyweight contender

Departments 

SPECIAL MACHINERY (SM)
SM-1 Space Vehicles and Carrier Rockets
SM-2 Aerospace Systems
SM-3 Ballistics and Aerodynamics
SM-4 High-accuracy Flight Units
SM-5 Autonomous Information and Control Systems
SM-6 Missile and Impulse Systems
SM-7 Special Robotics and Mechatronics
SM-8 Launch Rocket Complex
SM-9 Multipurpose Tracked Vehicles and Mobile Robots
SM-10 Wheel Vehicles
SM-11 Submarine Robots and Apparatus
SM-12 Technology of Manufacturing for Aerospace
SM-13 Composite Materials for Aerospace
INFORMATICS AND CONTROL SYSTEMS (IU)
IU-1 Automatic Control Systems for Flight Vehicles 
IU-2 Gyroscopic Instruments and Systems for orientation, navigation and stabilization
IU-3 Information Systems and Telecommunications
IU-4 Electronic Equipment Design and Technology
IU-5 Automatic Information Processing and Control Systems
IU-6 Computer Systems, Complexes and Networks
IU-7 Software for Computers and Automation Systems
IU-8 Information Security
IU-9 Computer Design and Technology
MACHINE-BUILDING TECHNOLOGIES (MT)
МТ-1 Metal-Cutting Machine Tools
МТ-2 Tool Technics
МТ-3 Technologies of Mechanical Engineering
МТ-4 Metrology and Interchangeability
МТ-5 Casting Technology
МТ-6 Technologies of Processing by Pressure
МТ-7 Technologies of Welding and Diagnostics
МТ-8 Materials Technology
MT-9 Industrial Design
МТ-10 The Equipment and Technologies Flatting Rinks
МТ-11 Electronic Technologies in Mechanical Engineering
МТ-12 Laser Technologies in Mechanical Engineering
МТ-13 Technologies of Materials Processing
ROBOTICS AND COMPLEX AUTOMATION (RK)
RK-1 Engineering Drawing
RK-2 Theory of Mechanisms and Machines
RK-3 Bases of Machine Designing
RK-4 Lifting-, Transport-, Construction Machines
RK-5 Applied Mechanics
RK-6 Computer Aided Design and Engineering
RK-9 Computer Systems of Manufacture Automation
RK-10 Robotic Systems
POWER ENGINEERING (E)
E-1 Rocket Engines
E-2 Piston Engines
E-3 Gas Turbine Plants and Non-conventional Power Installations
E-4 The Refrigerating, Cryogenic Technics, Central Airs and Life-support
E-5 The Vacuum and Compressor Technics
E-6 Thermophysics
E-7 Nuclear Reactors and Installations
E-8 Plasma Power Installations
E-9 Ecology and Industrial Safety
E-10 Hydromechanics, Hydromachines and Hydro-Pneumoautomatics
RADIOELECTRONICS AND LASER TECHNOLOGIES (RL)
RL-1 Radio-Electronic Systems and Devices
RL-2 Laser and Optic-Electronic Systems
RL-3 Optic-Electronic Devices for Scientific Research
RL-4 Theoretical Bases of Electrotechnology
RL-5 Sub-units of Apparatus Devices
RL-6 Technologies of Device Making
BIOMEDICAL TECHNOLOGIES (BMT)
BMT-1 Biomedical Technical Systems
BMT-2 Medic-Technical Information Technologies
BMT-3 Valeology
BMT-4 Medic-Technical Management
FUNDAMENTAL SCIENCES (FN)
FN-1 Higher Mathematics
FN-2 Applied Mathematics
FN-3 Theoretical Mechanics
FN-4 Physics
FN-5 Chemistry
FN-7 Electronic Engineering and Industrial Electronics
FN-11 Calculus Mathematics and Mathematical Physics
FN-12 Mathematical Modelling
ENGINEERING BUSINESS AND MANAGEMENT (EBM)
EBM-1 The Economic Theory
EBM-2 Economy and the Manufacture Organisation
EBM-3 Industrial Logistics
EBM-4 Organisation Management
EBM-5 Economy and Management at the Enterprise for Branches
EBM-6 Business and Foreign Trade Activities
EBM-7 Innovative Entrepreneurship
LINGUISTICS (L)
L-1 Russian
L-2 English Language for Instrument-Making Specialities
L-3 English Language for Machine-Building Specialities
L-4 Romano-Germanic Languages
SOCIAL AND THE HUMANITIES (SSH)
SSH-1 History
SSH-2 Sociology and Culturology
SSH-3 Political Science
SSH-4 Philosophy
JURISPRUDENCE (JUR)
JUR-1 Jurisprudence
JUR-2 Legal Expertise
Physical Education and Sanitation Department
Military Education Department

Branches and Other faculties
AK - Aerospace
OEP - Optic-Electronic Device Engineering
PS - Device Engineering
RKT - Space-Rocket Technics
RT - Radio-Technical
GUIMC – Lead Educational, Research and Methodical Vocational Rehabilitation Centre for Individuals with Health Disabilities

See also 
 Education in Russia
 List of universities in Russia

Notes and references

External links 

 Official web site (Russian)
 Official web site (English)
 Official web site of international activities (Russian and English)
 Unofficial web site for students (Russian)
 History of BMSTU (Russian)
 Top Industrial Managers for Europe

 
Educational institutions established in 1830
Education in the Soviet Union
Buildings and structures built in the Soviet Union
Engineering universities and colleges in Russia
1830 establishments in the Russian Empire
National research universities in Russia